Shantian station, is a station of  Line 21 of the Guangzhou Metro. It started operations on 28 December 2018.

Station Layout
The station has 2 elevated island platforms. Trains usually stop at the middle 2 platforms (platforms 1 and 2), with the express trains also passing through the middle tracks. Platforms 1 and 3 are for trains heading east to Zengcheng Square, whilst platforms 2 and 4 are for trains heading west to Yuancun.

Exits
There are 4 exits, lettered A, B, C and D. Exit A is accessible. All exits are located on Guangxian Highway.

History
This station was named Xiangling Station during the planning and construction. In March 2018, Guangzhou Metro Group declared the names of stations along Line 21 to the Place Names Committee of the Guangzhou Civil Affairs Bureau, and finally decided to use Shantian Station as the official name of the station.

At 12:28 pm on December 28, 2018, the station opened with the opening of the first section of Line 21.

Gallery

References

Railway stations in China opened in 2018
Guangzhou Metro stations in Zengcheng District